King Biscuit Flower Hour is a live album recorded live in 1984 and 1985 by Zebra, released in 1999. The tracks are mainly from Zebra and No Tellin' Lies. Some are played in an extended fashion, but most are just like the album. As a souvenir for the fans, an interview recorded on January 26, 1985 was added to the album.

Track listing
 "Who's Behind The Door?" - 7:55
 "The La La Song" - 9:10
 "Bears" - 4:46
 "Tell Me What You Want" - 4:08
 "I Don't Care" - 3:21
 "I Don't Like It" - 4:09
 "As I Said Before" - 3:05
 "Slow Down" (Larry Willams) - 3:50
 "Interview '85" - 20:18

Personnel
 Randy Jackson- Guitar and Vocals
 Felix Hanemann - Keyboards and Bass guitar
 Guy Gelso - Drums

References

External links
 [ Allmusic Guide listing]

Zebra (band) albums
1999 live albums